Arnold O. Beckman High School is a public school in Irvine, California, United States, serving 3,013 students from grades 9 through 12. The original $69 million facility (equivalent to $ million in ) was opened on August 30, 2004. The World Languages Building - a new, $17 million, two-story, 30,000-square-foot facility - was unveiled on September 1, 2015. The school is commonly known as Beckman and is named after Arnold Orville Beckman: a scientist, chemist, and philanthropist famed for inventing the pH scale during his tenure at Caltech and funding Silicon Valley's first semiconductor company (Shockley Semiconductor Laboratory, a division of Beckman Instruments, Inc.).

Since its founding in 2004, Beckman has been awarded the status of a California Distinguished School by the California State Board of Education in 2007, 2011, 2015, and again in 2019. Beckman primarily serves communities of Irvine and Tustin, including Tustin Ranch, Northpark, Orchard Hills, and West Irvine, as well as a small portion of Santa Ana. Although its facilities are physically located in Irvine, the school is administered by Tustin Unified School District. Beckman's mascot is the Patriot.

Beckman is accredited by the Western Association of Schools and Colleges (WASC) and is also a member of the National Association for College Admission Counseling (NACAC) and complies with the NACAC Statement of Principles of Good Practice.

On February 28, 2023, the school was subject to controversy when it was discovered that video cameras were found in a student bathroom.

Visual arts

In 2008 a visual arts student at Beckman High, won first place in Orange County in the Imagination Celebration Poster Contest.  The works of other students were selected to be exhibited at the Orange County Fine Arts Gallery as well.

In 2007, a student won second place in the photography division of the Music Center Spotlight Awards.

In 2009, a student won the grand prize in the Olympus Student Photo Contest as well as the Adobe Youth Voices contest.
 
Beckman hosted "A Miley-Sized Surprise" on December 31, 2008, featuring Miley Cyrus visiting Beckman. This was an award for a student who raised awareness about breast cancer through her hard work and contributions to the BHS Pink Ribbon Club. The show aired on New Year's Eve, and had 12.5 million viewers.

Athletics 

Beckman's athletics program include teams in football, water polo, swimming, basketball, volleyball, baseball, softball, soccer, lacrosse, tennis, wrestling, cross country, track and field, golf, dance, and cheer. However, because the school was brand new, and only had freshman and sophomores, many sports were forced to wait until the second year of the school's activity to play at the varsity level. The school has a rivalry with nearby Irvine High School.

Softball 
In 2007, softball won CIF.

Volleyball 
The 2007–2008 Beckman varsity volleyball team made it into the CIF championships for the second year in a row. In 2007–08 Beckman was undefeated in its preseason, got first and second in two tournaments, and got second in the PCL. Beckman lost to Oxnard in 2006–07 in four games, but in the 2007–08 season Beckman triumphed over Hemet High School in three games.
In 2018-2019, Beckman girls' volleyball won their first Pacific Coast League Championship. They also competed in the DII CIF-SS tournament, only losing to champions Los Alamitos.

Baseball
Beckman's baseball team has won seven Pacific Coast League Championships (2009, 2010, 2011, 2012, 2014, 2015 and 2018). In 2009, the baseball team won first place in the Pacific Coast League and went to the CIF–SS Finals at Angel Stadium of Anaheim. In 2011, the baseball team won the CIF–SS Championship, defeating Woodbridge High School 4-1 at Dodger Stadium. The Patriots have played in 3 CIF Finals. (2009, 2011, 2018)

In 2011, James Kaprielian was CIF Player of the Year. In 2015, Kaprielian was drafted in the 1st round of the MLB Draft (16th overall – New York Yankees)
In 2018, shortstop Matt McLain was drafted in the 1st Round of the MLB Draft. (25th overall - Arizona Diamondbacks)
Beckman plays its home games at Patriot Park .

Basketball
In the 2018-2019 season the Patriot Boys basketball won their first Pacific Coast League Championship. They also competed in the CIF-SS tournament, beating Twentynine Palms in Round 1 of the Division 3AA tournament.

Soccer 
In 2009, Beckman's girls' varsity soccer team made it into the CIF Championship game.
In 2019, Beckman girls' varsity soccer made an appearance to the CIF DI first round.
In 2011, Beckman's boys' varsity soccer had their first-ever First Team All Pacific League Player and earned First Team All Orange County.

Football 
Beckman's 2010 varsity football team earned their way into the CIF-SS Championships, but lost 30–31 due to a last-minute comeback by the Garden Grove Argonauts.  In the 2011 football season, Beckman's varsity team made it to the CIF-Southern Section Finals, and lost to Corona del Mar 13–14.

Golf 
Beckman's 2014 men's golf team won the CIF- Southern Section at Talega Golf Club. This was the first CIF Championships in Beckman golf history.

Water Polo 
In 2018-2019, Girls Water Polo won their first Pacific Coast League Championship and went on to appear in round one of the CIF-SS Division 3 tournament.
For the Beckman boy’s Water Polo 2017-2018 Season, head coach Duje Grubisič was brought on. Since then, the team has presented several first and second team all league selections. Under Grubisič in the 2018-2019 season, the boys finished in the top 28 of CIF-SS, competing in division II. In 2019-2020 season, Beckman boys' water polo would go on to compete in division 3 championship semi-finals. The boys would complete the shortened 2020-2021 in division 1/2 with a 6-1 record and winning the pacific coast league.

Cross Country 
In 2018-2019, Girls Varsity Cross Country won their first league title at the Pacific Coast League Finals. Girls and Boys Varsity Cross Country went on to compete at CIF.

In 2019-2020, Girls and Boys Cross Country won the league title at the Pacific Coast League Finals. Both teams continued to CIF Prelims and CIF-SS Finals. Frosh-Soph boys and girls also won their divisions at the Pacific Coast League Finals.

Wrestling 
In the 2019-2020 season, Beckman High School's wrestling team received its first league championship title after a win against the area University High School with a final score of 66-9 (Beckman). The team also went undefeated for the first time in its league, 5-0. Beckman won league championships in the 2020-2021 season as well, again going undefeated.

Notable alumni
James Kaprielian - pitcher for the Oakland Athletics.
Matt McLain - shortstop for the Cincinnati Reds, 17th pick overall 2021 MLB Draft.

References

External links

Tustin Unified School District

Educational institutions established in 2004
High schools in Orange County, California
Education in Irvine, California
Tustin, California
Public high schools in California
2004 establishments in California